The New Democratic Party of Ontario (Ontario NDP) is one of three major political parties in Ontario, Canada running in the 2011 Ontario general election.

By-elections

References

New Democratic Party
2011